Moštenica is a village and municipality in Banská Bystrica District in the Banská Bystrica Region of central Slovakia.

History
In historical records the village was first mentioned in 1340. One of Jakob Frugger's smelting plants was located in the settlement.

Geography
The municipality lies at an altitude of 479 metres and covers an area of 13.422 km². It has a population of about 189 people.

References

External links
http://www.mostenica.sk/

Villages and municipalities in Banská Bystrica District